Respiratory syncytial virus G protein is a protein produced by respiratory syncytial virus.

Some features of the G protein suggest it could be important to respiratory syncytial virus vaccine or antiviral drug target design.

References

Further reading

 

Viral structural proteins